Ulpana Tzfira is a religious institution for girls which is located in Tzafria, Israel. The Ulpana is related to Bnei-Akiva's yeshiva and was established in 1965.

External links 
 

Schools in Israel
1965 establishments in Israel
Educational institutions established in 1965